The National Rural Employment Generation Scheme (NREGS) is an employment scheme in India for providing 100 days guaranteed wage employment for all employment seekers above 18 years of age and willing to do work. The scheme came into force on 1995 in 199 districts in India and extended to another 130 districts later.

Kerala case study 2008 

In Kerala, the scheme was implemented in Palakkad and Waynad districts initially on 5 February 2006 and it was extended to all the 14 districts in the State on 1 April 2008.  Around five lakh people among them are estimated to have willingness to do physical labour.  The scheme provides minimal wages, however above the national wage rate.

Local governments are given a central role in the planning and implementation. Technical support is put in place. An appellate system has been put in place at the district level to facilitate speedy dispute resolution. Village Panchayats have been given the freedom to identify one willing public servant for social work to assist in mobilizing workers. 

Kudumbashree has been roped into the implementation of the programme. Under Kudumbashree every family below poverty line is organized into a Neighbourhood Group (NHG) with each family being represented only by a woman. These are then scaled up to ward level (a Village Panchayat Ward in Kerala has a population of around 15000 to 20000). Roles are allotted to volunteers. Since the poor are organizing themselves, there is greater internal understanding and sensitivity in community participation. 

Since Kerala has limited public land, the eco-restoration works are selected for in degraded forest lands. This created a new kind of relationship between a Panchayat Raj Institution and the government forest department. Technical help would be required to help identity work in plantation areas and coastal areas.  

Compared to the earlier wage employment programmes such as RLEGP, JRY, EAS, SGRY, IRDP, SGSY  there are a number of plus points. The factors contributing to this situation include: -

 A clear political decision was conveyed to the Panchayats that the scheme has to be implemented strictly as per the laws in force.
 The work is organized through the Kudumbashree system and the poor have a stake in the work right at the beginning.
 The power to measure works and recommend payments has been spread out and made more accountable through the Committee system with dispute resolution through an appellate system.
 Special emphasis has been given to the rights of workers and they have been made fully aware of their entitlements.
 All the payments are made only through the individual bank accounts of workers.

NREGA allowed itself to gain respectability as a public work as compared to poor turnout in the beginning. Over time a larger section of the target work force has been willing to join, some even equating NREGA wages as a salary. There was an interesting instance of a penurious descendant of the erstwhile Kollengode royal family in Palakkad taking an active part in NREGS and even motivating her relatives to join on the logic that self-help and access to legally entitled emoluments from a public source is better than charity from relatives.

A strong natural resource management focus has been given to NREGS. Bharathapuzha River rejuvenation with action plans emanating from the Village Panchayat as building blocks was taken up as a mega project under the scheme. Attempt is on to integrate NREGS and People's Plan. Skill development is to be integrated.  An innovative form of training has been developed by Kerala Institute of Local Administration (KILA) where there is a shift from the cascading model to a "ripple" model, according to which outstanding Panchayats become the master trainers and the neighbouring Panchayats formally learn from the experience of the best performers. The State level Monitors would be of two categories – outstanding individuals whose views are widely respected by society and senior Technical Experts capable of giving authoritative feed back on the quality of implementation.  

The initial years have laid a strong and competitive foundation as compared to other schemes with the same objectives. NREGS has suddenly increased the purchasing power of the poor and there is visible local economic development. A 2008 study conducted by Chathukulam and Gireesan, of Centre for Rural Management (CRM), indicated that major defects identified during previous wage employment programmes were absent in the NREGS in the State and provision of equal wages to men and women, non-involvement of contractors, minimal use of machinery, adherence to wage- material ratio. were followed, and the absence of muster roll manipulations was absent in the execution of the program in the initial two districts of Palakkad and Wayanad.

References

External links
 NREGA: Ship without rudder by Dr Jean Dreaze
 NREG implementation poor in state

Local government in Kerala
Rural development in India
Government welfare schemes in Kerala